UZB or uzb may be:
 an abbreviation for Uzbekistan, a country in Central Asia
 the ICAO code for Uzbekistan Airways,  the national airline of Uzbekistan 
 the ISO 639 code for the Uzbek language